Chrosiothes valmonti is a species of comb-footed spider in the family Theridiidae. It is found in St. Vincent.

References

Theridiidae
Spiders described in 1898